The Battle of Limburg was a battle of the War of the First Coalition, itself part of the French Revolutionary Wars. It took place on 9 November 1792 at Limburg an der Lahn between French Revolutionary forces and Prussian troops, ending in a French victory.

Course 
Whilst the Austrians were fearful of losing the Austrian Netherlands, the Prussian force had only just got out of France safely and was en route to oppose Adam-Philippe de Custine's invasion of the Palatinate of the Rhine. After leaving one division behind to protect Koblenz, Charles William Ferdinand, Duke of Brunswick-Wolfenbüttel used the rest of his force to garrison Limburg, aiming to halt the French advance.

On 8 November Custine ordered Jean Nicolas Houchard to concentrate all his detachments and attack the Prussians at Limburg, supported by Hugues Alexandre Joseph Meunier and his corps. Houchard surprised the Prussians, who did not think they would dare attack Limburg and so had left it badly guarded. The French quietly mounted their artillery batteries before the Prussians even thought to defend themselves but after much hesitation the Prussian hussars made a sortie against the French, throwing them into some confusion. However, they were soon repulsed by the artillery and pursued back inside the town. The Prussians were driven out of the town and retired towards Montabaur, whilst the French fortified Limburg.

Bibliography 
  Victoires, conquêtes, désastres, revers et guerres civiles des Français Tome 7
  Mémoires de Custine

References

1792
Sieges of the War of the First Coalition
Battles of the War of the First Coalition
Battles involving France
Battles involving Prussia
Battles in Hesse